Anolis tandai, Tanda's anole, is a species of lizard in the family Dactyloidae. The species is found in Brazil and Peru.

References

Anoles
Reptiles described in 1995
Reptiles of Brazil
Reptiles of Peru